Angern is a municipality in Saxony-Anhalt, Germany.

Angern may also refer to:

Places 
 Angern an der March, Austria
 Bujanov, Czech Republic
 Angerja, Estonia

People 
 Eva von Angern (born 1976), German politician
 Günther Angern (1893–1943), German army officer